Thyrgis flavonigra is a moth in the subfamily Arctiinae. It was described by Paul Dognin in 1910. It is found in Peru.

References

Natural History Museum Lepidoptera generic names catalog

Moths described in 1910
Arctiinae